The 
Jatir pita Bangabandhu Sheikh Mujibur Rahman Highway  or Dhaka–Bhanga Expressway is the first national expressway in Bangladesh. It is operated by the Road Transport and Highways Division. The express will be connected to Asian Highway 1.

History
ECNEC approved the Dhaka-Mawa-Bhanga expressway construction under Dhaka-Khulna Highway Project on 3 May 2016. The budget for the project was Tk 11,003.90 crore, later revised to Tk 6,892 crore. However, only half of the construction was done with this allocated money. With an additional Tk 4,111.86 crore the construction was completed. RHD and Bangladesh Army were involved in the construction of the expressway.

On 19 August 2021, it was proposed that Korea Expressway Corporation should be given the task of toll management of the expressway. The proposal was made by the Cabinet Committee on Economic Affairs (CCEA).

Overview
The six-lane expressway has two service lanes for local passengers, and 19 pedestrian underpasses for crossing. This expressway goes through five rivers via flyovers. The Padma Bridge is opened for public use, and people can use the bridge to enter the expressway.

Junction list

References 

Expressways in Bangladesh
AH1
Padma Bridge
2020 establishments in Bangladesh
Memorials to Sheikh Mujibur Rahman